The Most Outstanding Player Award is annually awarded to the best player in the Canadian Football League. The two nominees for the award are the Terry Evanshen Trophy winner from the East Division, and the Jeff Nicklin Memorial Trophy winner from the West Division. The winner of the award is chosen by the Football Reporters of Canada.

The award was created in 1953 as the Schenley Award, named after Schenley Distillers Corporation, to honour the most outstanding player in Canadian Rugby Union, one of the forerunner leagues of the CFL; Schenley ended its sponsorship of the awards in 1988, and the awards have been unsponsored since. Broadcasters Ernie Calcutt, John Badham and Pierre Dufault were regular presenters of the Schenley Award.

CFL's Most Outstanding Player Award winners

 2022 – Zach Collaros (QB), Winnipeg Blue Bombers
 2021 – Zach Collaros (QB), Winnipeg Blue Bombers
 2020 – Season cancelled due to the COVID-19 pandemic
 2019 – Brandon Banks (WR), Hamilton Tiger-Cats
 2018 – Bo Levi Mitchell (QB), Calgary Stampeders
 2017 – Mike Reilly (QB), Edmonton Eskimos
 2016 – Bo Levi Mitchell (QB), Calgary Stampeders
 2015 - Henry Burris (QB), Ottawa RedBlacks
 2014 – Solomon Elimimian (LB), BC Lions
 2013 – Jon Cornish (RB), Calgary Stampeders
 2012 – Chad Owens (WR/KR), Toronto Argonauts
 2011 – Travis Lulay (QB), BC Lions
 2010 – Henry Burris (QB), Calgary Stampeders
 2009 – Anthony Calvillo (QB), Montreal Alouettes
 2008 – Anthony Calvillo (QB), Montreal Alouettes
 2007 – Kerry Joseph (QB), Saskatchewan Roughriders
 2006 – Geroy Simon (SB), BC Lions
 2005 – Damon Allen (QB), Toronto Argonauts
 2004 – Casey Printers (QB), BC Lions
 2003 – Anthony Calvillo (QB), Montreal Alouettes
 2002 – Milt Stegall (SB), Winnipeg Blue Bombers
 2001 – Khari Jones (QB), Winnipeg Blue Bombers
 2000 – Dave Dickenson (QB), Calgary Stampeders
 1999 – Danny McManus (QB), Hamilton Tiger-Cats
 1998 – Mike Pringle (RB), Montreal Alouettes
 1997 – Doug Flutie (QB), Toronto Argonauts
 1996 – Doug Flutie (QB), Toronto Argonauts
 1995 – Mike Pringle (RB), Baltimore Stallions
 1994 – Doug Flutie (QB), Calgary Stampeders
 1993 – Doug Flutie (QB), Calgary Stampeders
 1992 – Doug Flutie (QB), Calgary Stampeders
 1991 – Doug Flutie (QB), BC Lions
 1990 – Mike "Pinball" Clemons (RB), Toronto Argonauts
 1989 – Tracy Ham (QB), Edmonton Eskimos
 1988 – David Williams (WR), BC Lions
 1987 – Tom Clements (QB), Winnipeg Blue Bombers

 1986 – James Murphy (WR), Winnipeg Blue Bombers
 1985 – Mervyn Fernandez (WR), BC Lions 
 1984 – Willard Reaves (RB), Winnipeg Blue Bombers
 1983 – Warren Moon (QB), Edmonton Eskimos
 1982 – Condredge Holloway (QB), Toronto Argonauts
 1981 – Dieter Brock (QB), Winnipeg Blue Bombers
 1980 – Dieter Brock (QB), Winnipeg Blue Bombers
 1979 – David Green (RB), Montreal Alouettes
 1978 – Tony Gabriel (TE), Ottawa Rough Riders
 1977 – Jimmy Edwards (RB), Hamilton Tiger-Cats
 1976 – Ron Lancaster (QB), Saskatchewan Roughriders
 1975 – Willie Burden (RB), Calgary Stampeders
 1974 – Tom Wilkinson (QB), Edmonton Eskimos
 1973 – George McGowan (WR), Edmonton Eskimos
 1972 – Garney Henley (WR), Hamilton Tiger-Cats
 1971 – Don Jonas (QB), Winnipeg Blue Bombers
 1970 – Ron Lancaster (QB), Saskatchewan Roughriders
 1969 – Russ Jackson (QB), Ottawa Rough Riders
 1968 – Bill Symons (RB), Toronto Argonauts
 1967 – Peter Liske (QB), Calgary Stampeders
 1966 – Russ Jackson (QB), Ottawa Rough Riders
 1965 – George Reed (RB), Saskatchewan Roughriders
 1964 – Lovell Coleman (RB), Calgary Stampeders
 1963 – Russ Jackson (QB), Ottawa Rough Riders
 1962 – George Dixon (RB), Montreal Alouettes
 1961 – Bernie Faloney (QB), Hamilton Tiger-Cats
 1960 – Jackie Parker (QB), Edmonton Eskimos
 1959 – Johnny Bright (RB), Edmonton Eskimos
 1958 – Jackie Parker (QB), Edmonton Eskimos
 1957 – Jackie Parker (RB), Edmonton Eskimos
 1956 – Hal Patterson (DB/OE), Montreal Alouettes
 1955 – Pat Abbruzzi (RB), Montreal Alouettes
 1954 – Sam Etcheverry (QB), Montreal Alouettes
 1953 – Billy Vessels (RB), Edmonton Eskimos

CFL's Most Outstanding Player Award - Runner Up
Note: Prior to 1973 the runner up for this award was not the Jeff Russel Memorial Trophy or Jeff Nicklin Memorial Trophy winners. Finalists were first announced in 1953 and during the first years there were multiple runners-up.

 1972 – Mack Herron (RB), Winnipeg Blue Bombers
 1971 – Leon McQuay (RB), Toronto Argonauts
 1970 – Tommy Joe Coffey (WR), Hamilton Tiger-Cats
 1969 – George Reed (RB), Saskatchewan Roughriders
 1968 – George Reed (RB), Saskatchewan Roughriders
 1967 – Tommy Joe Coffey (WR), Hamilton Tiger-Cats
 1966 – Ron Lancaster (QB), Saskatchewan Roughriders
 1965 – Garney Henley (DB), Hamilton Tiger-Cats
 1964 – Dick Shatto (RB), Toronto Argonauts
 1963 – Joe Kapp (QB), BC Lions
 1962 – Tommy Joe Coffey (WR), Edmonton Eskimos

 1961 – Jackie Parker (QB), Edmonton Eskimos
 1960 – Cookie Gilchrist (RB), Toronto Argonauts
 1959 – Bernie Faloney (QB), Hamilton Tiger-Cats
 1958 – Dick Shatto (RB), Toronto Argonauts
 1957 – Hal Patterson (DB/OE), Montreal Alouettes
 1956 – Jackie Parker (QB), Edmonton Eskimos
 1955 – Jackie Parker, Edmonton; Dick Shatto, Toronto; Ken Carpenter, Saskatchewan
 1954 – Rollie Miles, Edmonton & Alex Webster, Montreal
 1953 – Tex Coulter, Montreal; John Henry Johnson, Calgary, Gene Roberts, Ottawa

See also
 Jeff Nicklin Memorial Trophy
 Terry Evanshen Trophy
 Jeff Russel Memorial Trophy

References 

 

Canadian Football League trophies and awards
 
Most valuable player awards